Cyclohexanone is the organic compound with the formula (CH2)5CO. The molecule consists of six-carbon cyclic molecule with a ketone functional group. This colorless oily liquid has an odor reminiscent of acetone. Over time, samples of cyclohexanone assume a pale yellow color. Cyclohexanone is slightly soluble in water and miscible with common organic solvents.  Billions of kilograms are produced annually, mainly as a precursor to nylon.

Production
Cyclohexanone is produced by the oxidation of cyclohexane in air, typically using cobalt catalysts:
C6H12  +  O2   →   (CH2)5CO  +   H2O
This process forms cyclohexanol as a by-product, and this mixture, called "KA Oil" for ketone-alcohol oil, is the main feedstock for the production of adipic acid. The oxidation involves radicals and the hydroperoxide C6H11O2H as an intermediate. In some cases, purified cyclohexanol, obtained by hydration of cyclohexene, is the precursor. Alternatively, cyclohexanone can be produced by the partial hydrogenation of phenol:
C6H5OH + 2 H2 → (CH2)5CO
This process can also be adjusted to favor the formation of cyclohexanol.

ExxonMobil developed a process in which benzene is hydroalkylated to cyclohexylbenzene. This latter product is oxidized to a hydroperoxide and then cleaved into phenol and cyclohexanone. Therefore, this newer process without producing the acetone by-product appears attractive and is similar to the cumene process as a hydroperoxide is formed and then decomposed to yield two key products.

Laboratory methods
Cyclohexanone can be prepared from cyclohexanol by oxidation with chromium trioxide (Jones oxidation). An alternative method utilizes the safer and more readily available oxidant sodium hypochlorite.

Uses
The great majority of cyclohexanone is consumed in the production of precursors to Nylon 6,6 and Nylon 6.  About half of the world's supply is converted to adipic acid, one of two precursors for nylon 6,6. For this application, the KA oil (see above) is oxidized with nitric acid. The other half of the cyclohexanone supply is converted to cyclohexanone oxime.  In the presence of sulfuric acid catalyst, the oxime rearranges to caprolactam, a precursor to nylon 6:

Laboratory reactions
In addition to the large scale reactions conducted in service of the polymer industry, many reactions have been developed for cyclohexanone. In the presence of light, it undergoes alpha-chlorination to give 2-chlorocyclohexanone.  It forms a trimethylsilylenol ether upon treatment with trimethylsilylchloride in the presence of base.  It also forms an enamine with pyrrolidine.

Illicit use
Cyclohexanone has been used in the illicit production of phencyclidine and its analogs and as such is often subject to additional checks before purchase.

Safety
Like cyclohexanol, cyclohexanone is not carcinogenic and is moderately toxic, with a TLV of 25 ppm for the vapor.  It is an irritant.

References

6
IARC Group 3 carcinogens